Pino Mlakar (2 March 1907, Novo Mesto – 30 September 2006) was a Slovenian ballet dancer, choreographer, and teacher. He was born in Novo Mesto.

In 1927 he graduated from the Rudolf Laban Choreographic Institute in Hamburg.
He was a member of the Ljubljana Opera and Ballet Company from 1946 to 1960. For 25 years he was a full professor at the Academy for Theatre, Radio, Film and Television (AGRFT) of the University of Ljubljana.

He was married to fellow choreographer Maria Luiza Pia Beatrice Scholz (1910–2000), who was professionally known as Pia Mlakar. Their daughter Veronika Mlakar was also a ballet dancer.

He died in Novo Mesto.

External links
 Obituary (1 October 2006) "Umrl Pino Mlakar" 24ur Ljubljana in Slovenian, last accessed 9 May 2007

1907 births
2006 deaths
People from Novo Mesto
Slovenian male ballet dancers
Ballet choreographers
Ballet teachers
Slovenian choreographers
Academic staff of the University of Ljubljana
Prešeren Award laureates